Palaeophis ('ancient snake') is an extinct genus of marine snake that is the type genus of the extinct snake family Palaeophiidae.

Described species within this genus lived in the Eocene epoch, with some unnamed or questionable records from Cenomanian and Maastrichtian. Fossils of species within this genus have been found in England, France, Denmark, Morocco and Mali. Remains have also been found in North America, including Maryland and Virginia (from the early Eocene Nanjemoy Formation), Georgia and Mississippi.

Description

However, most species of the genus were not as big. There are many species of Palaeophis but it can be separated into two assemblages of species or grades. In which the primitive grade include species whose vertebrae are weakly laterally compressed and have less developed and low process of vertebrae. Subsequently the advanced grade are characterized by vertebrae presenting a strong lateral compression which translate to being much better adaption to aquatic life.

Biology
Species of Palaeophis were specialised aquatic animals, as their fossils occur primarily in marine strata, though at least some estuarine remains have also been found. Different species are thought to have occupied different ecological niches.

Studies on Palaeophis vertebrae show a high degree of vascularisation, suggesting that it had a considerably faster metabolism and growth rate than modern snakes. This may suggest that palaeophiids, like other marine reptiles such as mosasaurs, might have developed towards endothermy.

References

Eocene snakes
Paleocene reptiles of Europe
Paleogene reptiles of Africa
Eocene reptiles of Europe
Taxa named by Richard Owen
Fossil taxa described in 1841
Fossils of Denmark
Fur Formation

Fossils of Mali